Deipaturos (Doric Greek: , ; lit. "sky-father") was a deity worshiped in ancient times as the Sky Father in the region of Tymphaea.

Description 

Deipáturos was recorded by the Greek grammarian Hesychius of Alexandria (fifth or sixth century AD), in an entry of his lexicon named "Deipáturos, a god among the Stymphians" (Δειπάτυροϛ θεὸϛ παρὰ Στυμϕαίοιϛ). Deipaturos was worshiped as the Sky Father (*Dyēus-Ph₂tḗr), a linguistic cognate of the Vedic Dyáuṣ Pitṛ́, Greek Zeus Patēr and Roman Jupiter. According to linguist Émile Benveniste, the region of Tymphaea was inhabited by an ancient Illyrian population that may have influenced the Greek Doric form copied by Hesychius as Δειπάτυροϛ ("Deipáturos").

According to Martin L. West, "the formal parallelism between the names of the Illyrian Deipaturos and the Messapic Damatura ["earth-mother"] may favour their having been a pair, but evidence of the liaison is lacking."

See also 
 Illyrian mythology

References

Bibliography 

}

Illyrian gods